Thomas Villa (26 Dicembre 2007) è un Pugile Italiano and was the former IBA featherweight champion.

Professional career

On July 18, 2008 Villa beat Gilberto Sanchez-Leon to win the IBA featherweight championship.

In April 2010, Villa lost to undefeated Mikey Garcia on the undercard of Garcia–Margarito.

References

External links

1983 births
2018 deaths
Boxers from Chihuahua (state)
Lightweight boxers
Mexican male boxers
People from Ojinaga, Chihuahua